Yunus may refer to:

 Yunus, the Biblical prophet Jonah
 Yunus (given name), list of people with this given name
 Yunus (surname), list of people with this surname 
 Yunus (sura), a Quranic sura
 Yunus, Iran, a village in Hamadan Province

See also
 Yunusabad (or Yunus Abad), a Tashkent district
 Ibn Yunus (crater), a lunar crater
 Tan Sri Hassan Yunus Stadium, a multi-use Malaysian stadium
 Habar Yoonis, a Somali clan
 Khan Yunis, refugee camp in the Gaza strip